East Xujing is a station on Line 2 of the Shanghai Metro. It opened on 16 March 2010, and is the current western terminus of the line. Buses from East Xujing Station will take passengers to other locations in Qingpu.

The station is located in Shanghai's Qingpu District.

The first train is at 5:30 a.m., and the last train is at 11:30 pm. The Metro to Pudong Airport will take about  hours.
Line 17, however this station is not considered an interchange station with East Xujing.

References

Railway stations in Shanghai
Line 2, Shanghai Metro
Shanghai Metro stations in Qingpu District
Railway stations in China opened in 2010